Tauranga Domain is a park and sports stadium in Tauranga, New Zealand. It is used mainly for rugby union matches and serves as a home ground for the Bay of Plenty Rugby Union.

The origins of the park go back to 1873, when Tauranga residents applied to the Native Minister for a domain to be set aside. Five years later, the park was extended to the south. In 1881, the northern part was set aside for a secondary school. War memorial gates commemorate local men who died in World War I, and the gates are registered with Heritage New Zealand as a Category II item.

The park hosted its first National Provincial Championship game in 2015. Bay of Plenty lost to the visiting Waikato team by 43-10.

It also hosted host two more games in the 2016 Mitre 10 Cup. One against Taranaki and the other against Otago.

Bay of Plenty matches (men and women)

List of Bay Of Plenty Steamers and Volcanic matches played at Tauranga Domain.

References

Parks in New Zealand
1873 establishments in New Zealand
Urban public parks
Sports venues in the Bay of Plenty Region
Rugby union stadiums in New Zealand
Sport in Tauranga